Troy Wozniak (born 6 January 1978 in Blacktown, New South Wales) is an Australian former professional rugby league footballer in the Australasian National Rugby League (NRL) competition. He played for the Balmain Tigers, Parramatta Eels and Wests Tigers as well as Widnes Vikings in the Super League. Wozniak was primarily a utility player.

Career highlights
 First Grade Debut: 1999 - Round 6, Balmain Tigers vs North Sydney Bears at Leichhardt Oval, 10 April.

Footnotes

External links
Statistics at rugbyleagueproject.org

1978 births
Living people
Australian rugby league players
Balmain Tigers players
Parramatta Eels players
Rugby league centres
Rugby league second-rows
Rugby league locks
Rugby league players from Blacktown
Wests Tigers players
Widnes Vikings players